DXIM (936 AM) Radyo Pilipinas is a radio station owned and operated by the Philippine Broadcasting Service. The station's studio is located at Don Apolinar Velez, Brgy. Carmen, Cagayan de Oro, and its transmitter is located at the Fish landing Area of the Opol National Secondary Technical School, Brgy. Taboc, Opol, Misamis Oriental.

References

Radio stations in Cagayan de Oro
Radio stations established in 1974